Frederick Houser may refer to:

 Frederick F. Houser (1905–1989), Lieutenant Governor of California, 1943–1947
 Frederick W. Houser (1871–1942), his father, judge in California